Bryan Cristante  (born 3 March 1995) is an Italian professional footballer who plays as a midfielder for Serie A club Roma and the Italy national team.

Early life 
Cristante was born to a Canadian father of Italian descent and an Italian mother in San Vito al Tagliamento, Italy. He grew up in the district of San Giovanni in Casarsa della Delizia. Cristante's parents named him Bryan in honour of English singer Bryan Ferry. He holds dual Canadian–Italian citizenship.

Club career

Early career
Cristante was born in San Vito al Tagliamento but raised in the nearby San Giovanni di Casarsa, where he started playing football as a child. He moved on to Liventina Gorghense, an amateur club in the province of Treviso, before joining AC Milan in 2009.

AC Milan
Throughout his time in AC Milan's youth system he was a member of the under-15 squad who won the Campionato Giovanissimi Nazionali in 2010, scoring eight goals, as well as a member of the under-17 side who won the Campionato Allievi Nazionali in 2011.

He made his professional debut for the club on 6 December 2011, aged 16 years and 278 days, coming on as a substitute for Robinho in a UEFA Champions League group stage match against Viktoria Plzeň, which ended in a 2–2 draw. He thus became the youngest ever Milan player to feature in a Champions League game and third youngest overall.

Cristante was elected as the best player at the Torneo di Viareggio 2013. On 4 March 2013, Cristante signed his first professional contract, which would have kept him at Milan until 2018. He joined the first team squad at the start of the 2013–14 season.

On 10 November 2013, he made his debut in Serie A, coming on as a substitute for Kaká in a match against Chievo Verona, which ended in a 0–0 draw. He scored his first goal for the club on 6 January 2014, set up by the Brazilian in a 3–0 victory at the San Siro against Atalanta.

Benfica
On 1 September 2014, Cristante signed a five-year contract with Portuguese champions Benfica for a transfer fee of €4.84 million.

On 12 December, he debuted in a 0–5 Primeira Liga victory at Vitória Setúbal. On 14 January, he scored his first goal for the club in a 4–0 win against Arouca in the third round of the league cup.

Atalanta
Cristante joined Atalanta on loan from Benfica in January 2017; Atalanta later bought him outright in summer 2018 for the €4 million release clause, in a total fee of €9.5 million, with Benfica keeping 15% of Cristante's economic rights.

Roma
On 8 June 2018, Cristante was immediately loaned out to Roma in a one-year loan deal from Atalanta for a fee of €5 million with a compulsory purchase option for an additional €15 million and a further €10 million in performance-related bonuses. On 28 February 2019, Roma made the deal permanent.

International career
Prior to representing the Italian senior side, Cristante also represented Italy at various youth levels. He was initially also eligible to play for Canada at international level, as he holds a Canadian passport through his father.

On 10 November 2016, he made his debut with the Italy U21 team, in a friendly match lost 3–2 against England in Southampton.

Cristante was called up to the senior Italy national team for the side's 2018 World Cup qualifying matches against Macedonia and Albania on 6 and 9 October 2017, respectively. He made his senior international debut on 6 October, coming on as a substitute in the second half of an eventual 1–1 home draw against Macedonia. Cristante scored his first goal for the national team on 7 October 2020, the first goal of a 6–0 home win against Moldova in a friendly match.

In June 2021, he was included in Italy's squad for UEFA Euro 2020 by manager Roberto Mancini. On 11 July, Cristante won the European Championship with Italy following a 3–2 penalty shoot-out victory over England at Wembley Stadium in the final, after a 1–1 draw in extra-time; Cristante made a substitute appearance during the final, coming on for Nicolò Barella in the second half of regulation time, and played a role in helping Italy score the equalizing goal by setting up the goal of Leonardo Bonucci following a corner kick.

Style of play 
Cristante is known for his technical ability, vision, physicality, and versatility in central areas of the pitch, which allows him to win back possession and start attacking plays; moreover, he is adept with either foot and is also capable of making late attacking runs into the penalty area. While he is not known for his heading ability, his height also makes him effective in the air. Having started his senior career at Milan as a deep-lying playmaker or a regista in Italian, he successfully transitioned into an attacking midfielder, or a trequartista, in the 3–4–1–2 formation employed by manager Gian Piero Gasperini at Atalanta, which led him to score 15 times in just one and a half seasons for the club; he has also been used out wide on occasion. However, at Roma, while mostly playing as an offensive–minded central midfielder, known as the mezzala role in Italian football jargon, Cristante also began to be used as a central defender in the middle of a back three, courtesy of his positional sense, as well as his ability to play out or carry the ball out from the back.

Career statistics

Club

International

Scores and results list Italy's goal tally first, score column indicates score after each Cristante goal.

Honours
Benfica
Primeira Liga: 2014–15, 2015–16
Taça da Liga: 2014–15, 2015–16

Roma
UEFA Europa Conference League: 2021–22

Italy
UEFA European Championship: 2020
UEFA Nations League third place: 2020–21

Individual
Torneo di Viareggio – Golden Boy: 2013

Orders
 5th Class / Knight: Cavaliere Ordine al Merito della Repubblica Italiana: 2021

References

External links

 Profile at the A.S. Roma website
 
 
 

1995 births
Living people
People from San Vito al Tagliamento
Footballers from Friuli Venezia Giulia
Italian footballers
Italy youth international footballers
Italy under-21 international footballers
Italy international footballers
Association football forwards
A.C. Milan players
S.L. Benfica footballers
Palermo F.C. players
Delfino Pescara 1936 players
Atalanta B.C. players
A.S. Roma players
Serie A players
Primeira Liga players
UEFA Euro 2020 players
Italian expatriate footballers
Expatriate footballers in Portugal
Italian expatriate sportspeople in Portugal
Italian people of Canadian descent
UEFA European Championship-winning players
Knights of the Order of Merit of the Italian Republic
UEFA Europa Conference League winning players